Arram is a small (population 200) farming village in the East Riding of Yorkshire, England.

It forms part of the civil parish of Leconfield.

The main features are a small railway station on the Yorkshire Coast Line, proximity to RAF Leconfield and a red phonebox.

The village has a fishing venue on the tidal River Hull.

The road from Leconfield is one continuous corner due to being moved in the 1970s to accommodate the lengthening of the runway for Vulcan Bombers.

The Beverley Minster Way Walk goes through Arram.

Image gallery

References

External links

 

Villages in the East Riding of Yorkshire